Minh Đạo may refer to:

Minh Đạo (1042–1043), era name used by Lý Thái Tông
Minh Đạo or Ngũ chi Minh Đạo, a group of five Sino-Vietnamese religions, see Vietnamese folk religion#Minh Đạo
Minh Đạo, Bắc Ninh, a commune in Tiên Du District, Bắc Ninh, Vietnam

See also
Ming Dao, Taiwanese actor
Mingdao (disambiguation)